Lynn Lonidier (April 22, 1937 – May 18, 1993) was an American writer.

Literary career 
Lonidier published five collections of poetry including Po Tree (1967), The Female Freeway (1970), A Lesbian Estate (1977), Clitoris Lost: A Woman's Version of the Creation Myth (1989). She also published three broadsides. Janine Canan edited her posthumous collection of poetry.

References

1937 births
1993 deaths
Writers from Oregon
People from Lakeview, Oregon
American women poets
20th-century American women writers
20th-century American people